Jawani Diwani is a 1972 Hindi-language musical romance film directed by Narender Bedi, and starring Randhir Kapoor, Jaya Bhaduri, Balraj Sahni, Nirupa Roy as leads. This was also Kader Khan's debut as a dialogue writer.

The film is most remembered for its songs by R.D. Burman, including, "Jaane Jaan Doodta Phir Ruha", "Saamne Yeh Koun Aaya", "Nahi Nahi Abhi Nahi" and "Yeh Jawani Hai Diwani". The film was a musical hit and the ninth highest grossing film at the Indian Box Office.

After being stereotyped in the girl-next-door image after her Bollywood debut film, Guddi (1971), Jaya Bhaduri tried to break out of the mould with a glamorous role in the film.

The movie was remade in Kannada in 1991 as Aralida Hoovugalu.

Plot 
Madhu (Nirupa Roy) falls in love with Ravi Anand (Balraj Sahni), son of an employee in her Thakur brother's (Iftekhar) household. When they get married, the Thakur breaks all ties with them, she moves into Ravi's home, where they live with his younger brother, Vijay (Randhir Kapoor). Subsequently, Vijay meets a girl, Neeta (Jaya Bhaduri), at school, with the usual problems with parents. She turns out to be the Thakur's daughter, who has been promised in marriage to Benny Sinha (Narendra Nath).

Cast 
Randhir Kapoor as Vijay Anand
Jaya Bhaduri as Neeta Thakur
Balraj Sahni as Ravi Anand
Nirupa Roy as Madhu Anand
Iftekhar as Thakur
A. K. Hangal as College Principal
Narendra Nath as Benny Sinha
Paintal as Ratan
Satyendra Kapoor as Mamaji
Jagdish Raj as Mr. Sharma
Viju Khote as Mr. Gupta

Crew 
Director – Narendra Bedi
Writer – Inder Raj Anand, Kader Khan
Producer – Ramesh Behl
Music Director – Rahul Dev Burman
Lyricist – Anand Bakshi
Playback Singers – Asha Bhosle, Kishore Kumar
Soundtrack Label – Polydor (now Universal Music India Limited)

Music 
R. D. Burman composed and produced the music for this movie. The lyrics were written by Anand Bakshi.
The song, "Jaane Jaan Dhoondta Phir Raha" made it to #26 on the Binaca Geetmala annual list 1972. The title of the hit film, Yeh Jawaani Hai Deewani (2013) was taken from a hit song from the film, which in turn was recreated from his own version in the Bengali movie Rajkumari starring Tanuja, while it was subsequently recreated in the 2019 movie Student of the Year 2, a sequel to Student of the Year, with music composed by Vishal–Shekhar, and sung by Vishal Dadlani and Payal Dev, and Kishore Kumar (only singing the lyric tune of Yeh Jawani Hai Deewani).

Notes

References

External links 
 

Films scored by R. D. Burman
1972 films
1970s Hindi-language films
Indian romantic drama films
1972 romantic drama films
Films directed by Narendra Bedi
Hindi films remade in other languages
Rose Audio Visuals